Ana Patrícia Silva Ramos (born 29 September 1997) is a Brazilian beach volleyball player. She competed for Brazil with Rebecca Cavalcanti in women's beach volleyball at the  2020 Summer Olympics. In their match against Gaudencia Makokha and Brackcides Khadambi of Kenya in pool D they won in straight sets.

References

External links 
 
 
 
 
 Ana Patrícia at Confederação Brasileira de Voleibol 

1997 births
Living people
Brazilian women's beach volleyball players
Olympic beach volleyball players of Brazil
Beach volleyball players at the 2020 Summer Olympics
Beach volleyball players at the 2014 Summer Youth Olympics
Youth Olympic gold medalists for Brazil
21st-century Brazilian women